Theodore Keirstead Stackhouse (November 2, 1894 — November 24, 1975) was a Canadian ice hockey defenceman who played one season in the NHL for the Toronto St. Pats.

NHL season
Stackhouse played only 13 games in the NHL, all during the  1921–22 season. With Toronto he won the Stanley Cup, helping them defeat the Vancouver Millionaires of the Pacific Coast Hockey Association in the Finals.

Career statistics

Regular season and playoffs

References

1894 births
1975 deaths
Canadian ice hockey defencemen
Ice hockey people from Nova Scotia
People from New Glasgow, Nova Scotia
Providence Reds players
Stanley Cup champions
Toronto St. Pats players